Don Robinson was an American football player and coach. He served as the head football coach at Butler University in Indianapolis, Indiana for one season in 1906.

Robinson was a 1906 graduate of the University of Texas at Austin.

Head coaching record

References

Year of birth missing
Year of death missing
American football halfbacks
Butler Bulldogs football coaches
Texas Longhorns football players